Tall-e Deraz (also Romanized as Tall-e Derāz; also known as Ţūl-e Derāz) is a village in Ludab Rural District, Ludab District, Boyer-Ahmad County, Kohgiluyeh and Boyer-Ahmad Province, Iran. In the 2006 census, its population was 426 people, and 81 families.

References 

Populated places in Boyer-Ahmad County